Vynohradar is a historical neighbourhood in the Ukrainian capital Kyiv. Vynohradar is now located in the administrative Shevchenkivskyi District and Podilskyi Raion (district). Main roads in the area include the Prospekts Pravdy, Svobody and Georgiy Gongadze (former Prospekt Radianska Ukrainii, renamed in honour of Georgiy Gongadze in 2007.).

Vynohradar was founded in 1935 by farmer I.I. Bekasov, who planted grape vines here, hence the name. The kolkhoz «Vynohradar» was located here in the Soviet times. A residential massive was built in 1975–1987.

External links

 Виноградар in Wiki-Encyclopedia Kyiv  

Neighborhoods in Kyiv
Shevchenkivskyi District, Kyiv